Julio Capote (born October 22, 1932) is a Cuban actor.

Filmography 

{| class="wikitable sortable"
! Year !! Title !! Role(s)
|-
| rowspan="1" |1950 ||  La mesera coja del café del puerto|| Ricardo
|-
| rowspan="1" |1954 ||  The White Rose|| José Julián Martí Pérez joven
|-
| rowspan="1" |1992 ||  Cara sucia|| Fermín
|-
| rowspan="1" |2002 ||  Gata Salvaje|| Samuel Tejar
|}

References

Bibliography
 Rogelio Agrasánchez. Guillermo Calles: A Biography of the Actor and Mexican Cinema Pioneer''. McFarland, 2010.

External links

1932 births
Living people
Cuban male film actors